Hydrolaetare dantasi (Feijo white-lipped frog) is a species of frog in the family Leptodactylidae.
It is only known from the Amazon rainforest of Acre state in western Brazil, although it is likely that it has a wider distribution reaching Bolivia and Peru. Its natural habitats are tropical moist lowland forests, swamps, rivers, freshwater marshes, and intermittent freshwater marshes.
It is potentially threatened by habitat loss.

References

Hydrolaetare
Amphibians of Brazil
Endemic fauna of Brazil
Amphibians described in 1959
Taxonomy articles created by Polbot